Mohamed Berrabeh ( – born 2 October 1985, Berkane) is a Moroccan international footballer who plays as a midfielder for the Moroccan Botola side Wydad Casablanca since signing for them back in 2009 from Mouloudia Oujda.

References

External links
 goalzz.com
 

Moroccan footballers
1985 births
Living people
MC Oujda players
Morocco international footballers
People from Berkane
Ajman Club players
Al Dhafra FC players
Wydad AC players
RS Berkane players
UAE Pro League players
Association football midfielders